Empidadelpha propria is a species of dance flies, in the fly family Empididae.

References

Empididae
Insects described in 1928
Diptera of Australasia